"My Heart Will Go On" is a 1997 song recorded by the Canadian singer Celine Dion as the theme for the film Titanic. It was composed by James Horner, with lyrics by Will Jennings. It was produced by Horner, Walter Afanasieff and Simon Franglen. "My Heart Will Go On" was released as a single internationally on November 24, 1997, and was included on Dion's album Let's Talk About Love and the Titanic soundtrack.

Horner composed the basis of "My Heart Will Go On" as a motif used in the film soundtrack, and suggested developing it into a song. The Titanic director, James Cameron, resisted, as he felt a pop song would be inappropriate for the film, but agreed to use it after hearing the demo. The final version was arranged by Afanasieff.

"My Heart Will Go On" is considered Dion's signature song. It topped the charts in more than twenty-five countries. With worldwide sales estimated at over 18 million copies, it is the second-best-selling physical single by a woman in music history, and one of the best-selling physical singles of all time. It was also the world's best-selling single of 1998. It was included in the list of Songs of the Century by the Recording Industry Association of America and the National Endowment for the Arts. The music video was directed by Bille Woodruff and released at the end of 1997. Dion performed the song to honour the 20th anniversary of the film at the 2017 Billboard Music Awards on May 21, 2017.

Writing and recording
Before the release of the film Titanic, studio executives were worried that it would be a commercial failure. Sony had paid $800,000 for the rights to the soundtrack album and were hoping it would include a theme song. However, the director, James Cameron, did not want to end Titanic with a pop song, feeling it would be inappropriate.

James Horner initially composed the music for "My Heart Will Go On" as an instrumental motif for the film soundtrack. Wanting to prepare a vocal version to use during the end credits, he enlisted the lyricist Will Jennings, who wrote the lyrics "from the point of view of a person of a great age looking back so many years". Horner showed the song to Simon Franglen, who was working with him on electronic textures and synthesizers for the film score. Franglen suggested Céline Dion, with whom he had worked on many of her hits. Dion initially did not want to record it, as she had already recorded the film songs "Beauty and the Beast" and "Because You Loved Me". However, her husband and producer, René Angélil, convinced her to record a demo.

Horner waited until Cameron was in an appropriate mood before presenting him with the demo. After listening several times, Cameron approved it, but worried that he might be criticized for "going commercial at the end of the movie". Cameron also wanted to appease the anxious studio executives and "saw that a hit song from his movie could only be a positive factor in guaranteeing its completion". 

The producer Walter Afanasieff was not impressed with the demo, finding it meandering and dreary, but agreed to arrange and produce the studio version. He replaced every part of Horner's demo, and was upset that Horner was given a co-producer credit.

Composition 
The song is written in the key of E major. The verses follow the chord progression of E–Bsus4–Aadd9–E–B. The chorus has the chord progression of Cm–B–A–B. The song modulates to A-flat major. It contains heavy emphasis on the instrumental arranging. Usage of Tin Whistle is prominent, backed by melodic use of strings and rhythm guitars. The song features both acoustic and electronic instrumentation. Dion's vocal performance is described as "emotional" and "demanding" by Pandora Radio.

Versions 
According to the music executive Tommy Mottola, Dion recorded her vocal in one take, and that demo is what was released in the film. However, Dion re-recorded the song for her album release after the film's release and its success. It was an edited version with a few note changes at the end of the song.

The Horner-Franglen "demo" version of the ballad runs a little over five minutes and has an extended ending with longer, segmented vocalizations by Dion. Franglen mixed the final film and soundtrack version, expanding on the demo and adding orchestra to the final chorus. It is this version which appears on the Titanic soundtrack album and is also played over the ending credits of the film.

When the single was to be released to radio, it was produced further by Walter Afanasieff who added string and electric guitar, as well as rearranged portions of the song. This version, which runs a little over four and a half minutes, appears on both the 4-track maxi single and Dion's album Let's Talk About Love. At the height of the song's popularity, some radio stations in the US and the UK played an edited version of the song, that had dramatic moments of dialogue from the Jack and Rose lead characters in the film inserted in between Dion's vocal lines.

Sissel Kyrkjebø

The Norwegian singer Sissel Kyrkjebø was scheduled to record the song for the film in 1997, but Dion's vocals were preferred due to Horner's decision to support Dion's career. In a December 2014 interview, Horner quotes: "When I had completed the Titanic [film], I had to decide for Celine Dion or Sissel['s] [vocals]. Sissel I am very close, while Celine I had known since she was 18, and I had already written three film songs for [her]. But that was before Celine was known and filmmakers and marketing people had not done what they should have done for Celine and [her] songs. So I felt I owed her a Titanic chance, but I could [still] have used Sissel there". Instead, Kyrkjebø completed much of the score for the soundtrack album, Titanic: Music from the Motion Picture. Dion accepted to sing a demo for the film, despite being initially hesitant to record as she had already done three film songs earlier. Years later, Horner chose Kyrkjebø to perform "My Heart Will Go On" on both world premieres of Titanic 3D (2012) and Titanic Live (2015).

Critical reception
AllMusic senior editor Stephen Thomas Erlewine wrote that the song "shines the most brilliantly" and marked it as a standout track from the Let's Talk About Love album. Another AllMusic reviewer, single editor Heather Phares, who rated the single 4 out of 5 stars, wrote, "Indeed, her performances of it on VH1 Divas, the 1998 Academy Awards (wearing the film's 'Heart of the Ocean' pendant, no less), and on her 1997 album Let's Talk About Love have cemented 'My Heart Will Go On' as the quintessence of Dion's sweeping, romantic style". Larry Flick from Billboard called it a "stately ballad", noting that the song "woos with romantic lyrics and a melancholy melody that is fleshed out with a weeping flute solo." He added, "There's no denying that Dion can hit notes that shatter glass—and she does so here—but it's a pleasure to hear her build slowly and remind listeners of her ability to pack volumes of emotion in a whisper. A fine single that will add a much-needed touch of class to every station it graces." People Magazine stated that "the dramatics are fitting when she sings "My Heart Will Go On" as a survivor mourning the lover she lost when the big ship went down." Yahoo.com described it as an "emotional power ballad that perfectly captured [Titanics] romantic yearning". Vulture said that it is a powerful song and has "one of the most glorious key changes in recorded music history", and that "its legacy is eclipsed only by" Whitney Houston's "admittedly far superior" song "I Will Always Love You". Washington Post appreciated how the song was not just tagged on the end of the three-hour film, but has a lyrical motif that was already placed throughout the key moments of the film's love story in order to create a musical narrative.

The song has also received criticism. In 2011, Rolling Stone readers ranked it the seventh worst song of the 1990s, with the magazine writing, "Celine Dion's song and the movie have aged very poorly...Now [the song] probably just makes you cringe." The Atlantic attributed the song's decline in popularity to its overexposure and added that over the years there have been many jokes that parody the song's lyrics by claiming "My Heart Will Go On" goes "on and on and on". Vulture reasoned that it has become fashionable to dislike the song because it "encapsulates most everything that once-enthusiastic moviegoers now dislike about Titanic: it's outdated, cheesy, and overly dramatic". Maxim deemed it "the second most tragic event ever to result from that fabled ocean liner".

Accolades
"My Heart Will Go On" has accumulated multiple awards from prestigious award giving bodies across the world. It won the 1998 Academy Award for Best Original Song. It dominated the 1999 Grammy Awards, winning Record of the Year — marking the first time to be won by a Canadian — Song of the Year, Best Female Pop Vocal Performance and Best Song Written Specifically for a Motion Picture or Television. The song also won the Golden Globe Award for Best Original Song in 1998.

The song won a Japanese Gold Disc Award, for Song of the Year, as well as a Billboard Music Award for Soundtrack Single of the Year. Moreover, it also won at MTV Asia Awards for International Song of the Year in 1999.

It has been named one of the Songs of the Century. It is one of the best-selling singles ever in the United Kingdom, the second single released by Dion to sell over a million copies there. This made Dion one of only two female artists to date to have released two million-selling singles in Britain. In December 2007, the song was placed on number 21 on VH1's "100 Greatest Songs of the 90's". In April 2010, the UK radio station Magic 105.4 voted the single the "top movie song of all time" after listeners's votes. It was ranked at number 14 on AFI's 100 Years...100 Songs, celebrating the 100 greatest songs in American film history.

Cultural impact
The song became "imprinted on the movie's legacy", and every listen prompts a reminder of the blockbuster and the hype surrounding it. USA Today agreed that the song will be forever tied to Titanic. The Washington Post says it is the marriage of music and image that make both the song and film greater than the sum of their parts.

Los Angeles Times stated that: "My Heart Will Go On helped make 1998 an amazing year for big pop Ballads. The Atlantic stated that its popularity did not stem from being played at events such as high school proms, weddings, and funerals, but by being indelibly placed into pop culture through numerous plays on the radio station, speakers, and passing cars. Anne T. Donahue from TrackRecord called it "The Greatest Movie Ballad Of All Time" stating: "It changed the game for movie ballads altogether, and the impact was felt immediately." MTV listed 'My Heart Will Go On' as the sixth biggest song of the 90s.

The song, along with Dion's rendition of "The Power of Love", are used by members of siren kings, the New Zealand Polynesian youth subculture who stage modified vehicle public address system loudspeaker competitions. The song is a staple of the competitions, due to the purity and clarity of Dion's voice suiting the audio range for public address systems.

In the late 2010s, a pop culture trend emerged on platforms such as YouTube in which the song's iconic key change would be edited in as the soundtrack to a dramatic moment from a sporting match, such as a match winning shot. During the pandemic, Barcelona Pianist Alberto Gestoso Performed 'My Heart Will Go On' for His Quarantined Neighbors. In early 2021, DJ at Trump's Washington rally played "My Heart Will Go On" to the crowd.

The film Barb and Star Go to Vista Del Mar (2021) featured a remix of the song. Bruno Mars opened his first show since early 2020 at MGM, in continuation of his Las Vegas residency and did a rendition of the song. Ariana Grande sang the song with James Corden on a segment at The Late Late Show with James Corden.

Music video
The video was directed by Bille Woodruff and shows Dion singing at the bow of the ship while scenes from the film are inter-cut in between. It was filmed in front of a green screen in Los Angeles. Titanic computer artists filled in the background. On set, Celine provided one special effect, it required her to sing a high speed version of the signature song. In January 2018 the director's cut of the music video appeared on YouTube. It contains unseen footage of Celine including her walking to the bow and a segment which puts her right into the movie.

Live performances
"My Heart Will Go On" was performed by Dion in concert during her Let's Talk About Love World Tour (1998–1999), her Las Vegas residency show A New Day... (2003–2007), her Taking Chances World Tour (2008–2009) and her second Las Vegas residency show Celine (2011–2019). It was also performed during her show "Une seule fois" at Sur les plaines d'Abraham in Quebec City July 27, 2013, during her Tournée Européenne 2013, her Summer Tour 2016, Live 2017 and Live 2018 tours and most recently her Courage World Tour. Dion also performed the song during her BST Hyde Park concert in London on July 5, 2019. One of her backup singers played the tin whistle part of the song.

Acclaims
MTV called Dion's performance at the 70th Academy Award "true perfection", adding: "she sounds flawless as she effortlessly belts out the Best Original Song-winner".

Commercial performance
"My Heart Will Go On" is one of the biggest radio hits and best-selling singles in history, having sold more than 18 million copies worldwide. It was also the best selling single of 1998 worldwide. As of March 2023, "My Heart Will Go On" has drawn 5 billion in cumulative airplay audience and over 728 million official streams in the United States.

United States
In the United States, the song was given a limited number of copies – 658,000. Regardless, it debuted at number one on the Billboard Hot 100, with sales of 360,000 copies, where it stayed for two weeks. In addition, the song spent ten weeks at number-one on the Billboard Hot 100 Airplay, and was number one for two weeks on the Hot 100 Singles Sales. As a testament to the popularity of the song on the radio, the song broke the record for the then-largest radio audience ever, garnering 117 million listeners in February 1998. The single was eventually certified gold in the United States. Billboard reported that the digital copy of the single has sold 1,133,000 units since being available bringing total sales to 1,791,000 copies sold in the US. In 2011 alone, Dion has sold 956,000 digital tracks in the US, with My Heart Will Go On being her biggest digital tracks (163,000 downloads). In an article published by Billboard in November 2019, "My Heart Will Go On" has 588.2 million on-demand streams in the US, making it her most streamed song in the country.

In addition "My Heart Will Go On" reached number one in several other US charts, including, Billboards Hot Adult Contemporary Tracks, Top 40 Mainstream, Hot Latin Pop Airplay, and Hot Latin Tracks. For the latter, the single became the first English-language song to top the Hot Latin Tracks chart, to which Dion was given a Billboard Latin Music Award for that achievement.

United Kingdom
In the United Kingdom, the song debuted at number one with first week sales of 234,000 copies. As of February 2022, the song has already sold in excess of 2,100,000 units, becoming Dion's second million-selling single in Britain, following "Think Twice" in 1995, and Britain's second-best-selling single of 1998, behind Cher's "Believe". This made her the first solo female artist to have multiple million-selling singles in Britain.

Rest of the world
In Germany, "My Heart Will Go On" was certified 4× platinum for selling over two million copies, and was ranked as one of the most popular singles ever released there. It sold over 1.2 million copies in France, being certified Diamond. Additionally, the song was certified 3× Platinum in Belgium, 2× Platinum in Australia, the Netherlands, Norway, Sweden, and Switzerland, Platinum in Greece, and Gold in Austria. "My Heart Will Go On" was released twice in Japan. The regular edition from January 1998 sold 205,300 and was certified 2× Platinum, for 200,000 copies sold. The remixed edition released in June 1998 sold 111,920 copies and was certified Gold for 100,000 copies sold, because maxi-singles are treated as an album.

Internationally, the song was phenomenally successful, spending many weeks at the top position in various countries, including 17 weeks on the Eurochart Hot 100 Singles, 15 weeks in Switzerland, 13 weeks in France and Germany, 11 weeks in the Netherlands and Sweden, 10 weeks in Wallonia, Denmark, Italy, and Norway, seven weeks in Flanders, six weeks in Ireland and Canada, four weeks in Australia and Austria, two weeks in Spain and the United Kingdom, and one week in Finland.

Album appearances
The music video was included on the All the Way... A Decade of Song & Video DVD and on the Titanic (Three-Disc Special Collector's Edition) DVD release on October 25, 2005. In addition to Dion's Let's Talk About Love and the Titanic soundtrack, "My Heart Will Go On" appears on several other albums, including VH1 Divas Live, Au cœur du stade, All the Way... A Decade of Song, A New Day... Live in Las Vegas, Complete Best, My Love: Essential Collection, Taking Chances World Tour: The Concert, and Céline... une seule fois / Live 2013. It was also included on the DVDs for Au cœur du stade, All the Way... A Decade of Song & Video, Live in Las Vegas: A New Day..., and Celine: Through the Eyes of the World.

It was included later on the Back to Titanic second soundtrack album, but it does not appear on the 20th anniversary edition. In France, "My Heart Will Go On" was released as a double A-side single with "The Reason". In the Let's Talk about Love album booklet, the lyrics of the song contain an additional line between a second chorus and the final verse. The words "There is some love that will not go away" are not performed by Dion in any available version of the song, however, they are still included on Dion's official site.

Track listing

Singles

European CD single
"My Heart Will Go On" – 4:40
"Because You Loved Me" – 4:33

European CD single (Remix)
"My Heart Will Go On" – 4:40
"My Heart Will Go On" (Tony Moran Mix) – 4:21

French CD single (double A-side)
"The Reason" – 5:01
"My Heart Will Go On" – 4:40

French CD single
"My Heart Will Go On" – 4:40
"Southampton" – 4:02

Japanese CD single
"My Heart Will Go On" – 4:40
"Beauty and the Beast" – 4:04

UK cassette single
 "My Heart Will Go On" – 4:40
 "I Love You" – 5:30

US CD and cassette single
"My Heart Will Go On" – 4:40
"Rose" – 2:52

Maxi-singles

Australian/Brazilian/European/UK CD maxi-single
"My Heart Will Go On" – 4:40
"Because You Loved Me" – 4:33
"When I Fall in Love" – 4:19
"Beauty and the Beast" – 4:04

Australian CD maxi-single (Remixes)
"My Heart Will Go On" (Tony Moran Mix) – 4:21
"My Heart Will Go On" (Richie Jones Mix) – 4:15
"My Heart Will Go On" (Soul Solution Mix) – 4:18
"Misled" (The Serious Mix) – 7:22
"Love Can Move Mountains" (Underground Vocal Mix) – 7:14

Brazilian CD maxi-single (Remixes)
"My Heart Will Go On" (Cuca's Radio Edit) – 4:22
"My Heart Will Go On" (Tony Moran's Anthem Edit) – 4:21
"My Heart Will Go On" (Richie Jones "Unsinkable" Edit) – 4:15
"My Heart Will Go On" (Tony Moran's Anthem Vocal) – 9:41

European CD and 12" maxi-single (Remixes)
"My Heart Will Go On" (Album Version) – 4:40
"My Heart Will Go On" (Tony Moran Mix) – 4:21
"My Heart Will Go On" (Richie Jones Mix) – 4:15
"My Heart Will Go On" (Soul Solution) – 4:18

Japanese CD maxi-single (Remixes)
"My Heart Will Go On" (Tony Moran Mix) – 4:21
"My Heart Will Go On" (Richie Jones Mix) – 4:16
"My Heart Will Go On" (Soul Solution Mix) – 4:19
"My Heart Will Go On" (Richie Jones "Unsinkable" Club Mix) – 10:03
"My Heart Will Go On" (Matt & Vito's "Unsinkable" Epic Mix) – 9:52

UK CD maxi-single ("Heart")
"My Heart Will Go On" (Soundtrack Version) – 5:07
"Have a Heart" – 4:12
"Nothing Broken but My Heart" – 5:55
"Where Does My Heart Beat Now" – 4:32

Remixes

"My Heart Will Go On" (Tony Moran Mix) – 4:21
"My Heart Will Go On" (Tony Moran's Anthem Vocal) – 9:41
"My Heart Will Go On" (Richie Jones Mix) – 4:15
"My Heart Will Go On" (Richie Jones "Go On" Beats) – 5:12
"My Heart Will Go On" (Richie Jones "Unsinkable" Club Mix) – 10:03
"My Heart Will Go On" (Soul Solution Mix) – 4:18
"My Heart Will Go On" (Soul Solution Percappella) – 4:16
"My Heart Will Go On" (Soul Solution Bonus Beats) – 3:32
"My Heart Will Go On" (Soul Solution Drama at Sea Mix) – 9:10
"My Heart Will Go On" (Matt & Vito's "Unsinkable" Epic Mix) – 9:52
"My Heart Will Go On" (Matt & Vito's Penny Whistle Dub) – 3:21
"My Heart Will Go On" (Cuca's Radio Edit) – 4:22

Personnel
Celine Dion – vocals
Walter Afanasieff – arrangements, keyboards, producer
Lillias White, LaChanze, Roz Ryan, Cheryl Freeman and Vanéese Y. Thomas – background vocals
Andrea Corr – tin whistle
Yves Frulla – keyboards
Michael Thompson and Andre Coutu – guitars
Marc Langis – bass
Dominique Messier – drums
Yoshinobu Takeshita (Kryzler & Kompany) – computer programming
Felipe Elgueta – engineering, programming
Humberto Gatica – engineering, mixing
Vito Luprano – executive producer
Paul Picard – percussion
James Horner – music
Will Jennings – lyrics
Ross Hogarth – mixing
Simon Franglen – synclavier programming

Charts

Weekly charts

Year-end charts

Decade-end charts

All-time charts

Certifications and sales

Release history

See also

 List of best-selling singles
 Academy Award for Best Original Song
 French Top 100 singles of the 1990s
 Golden Globe Award for Best Original Song
 Grammy Award for Best Female Pop Vocal Performance
 Grammy Award for Best Song Written for Visual Media
 Grammy Award for Record of the Year
 Grammy Award for Song of the Year
 List of artists who have achieved simultaneous UK and US number-one hits
 List of Australian chart achievements and milestones
 List of best-selling singles in France
 List of best-selling singles in Germany
 List of best-selling singles in the United Kingdom
 List of best-selling singles of the 1990s in the United Kingdom
 List of best-selling singles of the 20th century in the United Kingdom
 List of Billboard Hot 100 chart achievements and milestones
 List of Billboard Hot 100 number-one singles of the 1990s
 List of Billboard Mainstream Top 40 number-one songs of the 1990s
 List of million-selling singles in the United Kingdom
 List of number-one hits (Germany)
 List of number-one singles and albums in Sweden
 List of number-one singles in Australia during the 1990s
 List of number-one singles of the 1990s (Switzerland)
 List of number-one songs in Norway
 List of UK Singles Chart number ones of the 1990s

References

Further reading

External links

1997 singles
1997 songs
1990s ballads
Best Original Song Academy Award-winning songs
Best Original Song Golden Globe winning songs
Billboard Hot 100 number-one singles
Celine Dion songs
Columbia Records singles
Dutch Top 40 number-one singles
Epic Records singles
European Hot 100 Singles number-one singles
Grammy Award for Best Female Pop Vocal Performance
Grammy Award for Best Song Written for Visual Media
Grammy Award for Record of the Year
Grammy Award for Song of the Year
Irish Singles Chart number-one singles
Love themes
Music videos directed by Bille Woodruff
RPM Top Singles number-one singles
Number-one singles in Australia
Number-one singles in Austria
Number-one singles in Denmark
Number-one singles in Finland
Number-one singles in Germany
Number-one singles in Greece
Number-one singles in Hungary
Number-one singles in Iceland
Number-one singles in Italy
Number-one singles in Norway
Number-one singles in Scotland
Number-one singles in Spain
Number-one singles in Sweden
Number-one singles in Switzerland
SNEP Top Singles number-one singles
UK Singles Chart number-one singles
Ultratop 50 Singles (Flanders) number-one singles
Ultratop 50 Singles (Wallonia) number-one singles
Pop ballads
Song recordings produced by Walter Afanasieff
Songs with lyrics by Will Jennings
Songs written by James Horner
Songs written for films
Sony Music singles
Titanic (1997 film)